Big City is a 1937 American drama film directed by Frank Borzage and starring Luise Rainer and Spencer Tracy. The film was also released as Skyscraper Wilderness.

Plot
Joe Benton (Spencer Tracy) and his wife Anna (Luise Rainer) are suspected of starting a taxi war. Although innocent, they are blamed for everything that has happened and the officials demand that Anna be deported from the United States. While trying to prove their innocence, the couple feels forced to hide.

The film also casts a number of popular sports figures including Jack Dempsey, James J. Jeffries, Jim Thorpe, and Frank Wykoff in minor comic roles.

Cast

 Luise Rainer as Anna Benton
 Spencer Tracy as Joe Benton
 Charley Grapewin as Robert, the Mayor
 Janet Beecher as Sophie Sloane
 Eddie Quillan as Mike Edwards
 Victor Varconi as Paul Roya
 Oscar O'Shea as John C. Andrews
 Helen Troy as Lola Johnson
 William Demarest as Beecher
 John Arledge as Bud
 Irving Bacon as Jim Sloane
 Guinn "Big Boy" Williams as Danny Devlin
 Regis Toomey as Fred Hawkins
 Edgar Dearing as Tom Reilley
 Paul Harvey as District Attorney Gilbert
 Andrew Tombes as Inspector Matthews
 Clem Bevans as Grandpa Sloane
 Grace Ford as Mary Reilley
 Alice White as Peggy Devlin
 Paul Fix as Comet Night Watchman (uncredited)
 Ray Walker as Eddie Donogan, Independent Cab Driver (uncredited)
 George Godfrey as himself

Reception
Writing for Night and Day in 1937, Graham Greene gave the film a poor review, describing it as "just possible to sit through". Greene's primary complaint was about the acting which he found to be "heavily laid on" with "people in this film [being] too happy before disaster: no one is as happy as all that, no one so little prepared for what life is bound to do sooner or later". The only consolation for Greene was that of Borzage's direction which Greene described as "sentimental but competent".

Box office
According to MGM records the film earned $906,000 in the US and Canada and $695,000 elsewhere resulting in a profit of $462,000.

References

External links

 
 
 
 
 Review of film at Variety

1937 films
1937 drama films
American black-and-white films
American drama films
Films directed by Frank Borzage
Films produced by Frank Borzage
Metro-Goldwyn-Mayer films
1930s English-language films
1930s American films